Sharon Block may refer to:

 Sharon Block (born 1941), member of the Idaho House of Representatives
 Sharon Block (government official), member of the National Labor Relations Board (2012–2013) and professor at Harvard Law School